Barjac is a commune in the Gard department in southern France.

Barjac is a Renaissance town. The old city centre retains ancient narrow streets, squares and houses of that time. The  with its stone courtyard,
once called the "Citadel", has been rebuilt several times from the twelfth century. This imposing edifice now features a library in the former stables, and a cinema in the old kitchens. The chateau is the venue for the festival "Chansons de Paroles" (Songs and Words) held annually in late July.

The contemporary German artist Anselm Kiefer has had his studio, called the Ribaute, in Barjac since 1993 in a former industrial wasteland of 35 hectares.

Population

See also
 Côtes du Vivarais AOC
Communes of the Gard department

References

External links

Le Gard provençal 

Communes of Gard